The Strand Fiord Formation is a Late Cretaceous volcanic component, located on northwestern and west-central Axel Heiberg Island, Nunavut, Canada.

The Strand Fiord Formation contains columnar jointing units that are usually  in diameter. The formation is interpreted to represent the cratonward extension of the Alpha Ridge, a volcanic ridge that was active during the formation of the Amerasia Basin. The Strand Fiord Formation is also part of the High Arctic Large Igneous Province.

See also
Volcanism of Canada
Volcanism of Northern Canada
List of volcanoes in Canada
Ellesmere Island Volcanics

References

Volcanism of Nunavut
Upper Cretaceous Series of North America
Flood basalts
Stratigraphy of Nunavut
Volcanism of the Arctic Ocean